The 2006 FIBA Asia Champions Cup was the 17th staging of the FIBA Asia Champions Cup, the basketball club tournament of FIBA Asia. The tournament was held in Kuwait City, Kuwait from May 31 to June 8, 2006.

Qualification
According to the FIBA Asia rules, each zone had one place, and the hosts (Kuwait) and Asian champion (Qatar) were automatically qualified. The other three places are allocated to the zones according to performance in the 2005 FIBA Asia Champions Cup.

* Withdrew

Preliminary round

Group A

Group B

Final round

Quarterfinals

Semifinals 5th–8th

Semifinals

7th place

5th place

3rd place

Final

Final standing

External links
Official website
Fibaasia.net

2006
Champions Cup
B
FIBA Asia Champions Cup 2006